Mech is a surname. Notable people with the surname include:

 L. David Mech (born 1937), American biologist
 Ramu Mech, Indian ULFA member and prisoner
 Tim Mech, Canadian guitarist and guitar technician
 Hassan El-Mech (born 1945), Moroccan sprinter